Daily News is a daily newspaper owned by Independent News & Media SA and published every weekday afternoon in Durban, South Africa. It was called Natal Daily News between 1936 and 1962 and The Natal (Mercantile) Advertiser prior to 1936, going back to the 19th century.

In June 2010 the newspaper had daily average sales of 57,000 and an estimated daily readership of 320,000 people. It is an English-language newspaper and was first published in 1878.

Supplements 
Tonight (Monday–Friday) 
Bollyworld (Monday)
Motoring (Thursday)
What's the Bet (Friday)
Workplace (Wednesday)

Distribution areas

Distribution figures

Readership figures

See also
 List of newspapers in South Africa

References

External links
 Daily News Website
 SAARF Website

1878 establishments in the Colony of Natal
Mass media in Durban
Daily newspapers published in South Africa
Publications established in 1878